Gabon competed at the 2012 Summer Olympics in London, from 27 July to 12 August 2012. This was the nation's ninth appearance at the Olympics; the nation did not participate at the 1976 Summer Olympics in Montreal and 1980 Summer Olympics in Moscow, affected by the African and the American-led boycott, respectively.

The Gabon Olympic Committee sent the nation's largest delegation ever to the Games. A total of 24 athletes, 22 men and 2 women, competed in 5 sports. Men's football was the only team sport in which Gabon was represented at these Olympic games. Sprinter Ruddy Zang Milama was the nation's flag bearer at the opening ceremony.

Gabon left London with its first ever Olympic medal. Taekwondo jin Anthony Obame won the silver in the men's super heavyweight division, narrowly losing to Italy's Carlo Molfetta in the final.

Medalists

Athletics

Gabonese athletes have so far achieved qualifying standards in the following athletics events (up to a maximum of 3 athletes in each event at the 'A' Standard, and 1 at the 'B' Standard):

Key
Note–Ranks given for track events are within the athlete's heat only
Q = Qualified for the next round
q = Qualified for the next round as a fastest loser or, in field events, by position without achieving the qualifying target
NR = National record
N/A = Round not applicable for the event
Bye = Athlete not required to compete in round

Men

Women

Boxing

Gabon has so far qualified boxers for the following events

Men

Football

Gabon's men's football team has qualified.

Men's tournament

Team roster

Group play

Judo

Taekwondo

References

External links
 
 

Nations at the 2012 Summer Olympics
2012
Olympics